The 2003 American Handball Women's Youth Championships took place in São José dos Pinhais and Curitiba  from September 24 – 28.

Teams

Preliminary round

Group A

Group B

Placement 5th–8th

7th/8th

5th/6th

Final round

Semifinals

Bronze medal match

Gold medal match

Final standing

References 
 brasilhandebol.com.br 

2003 in handball
Pan American Women's Youth Handball Championship
2003 in youth sport